The 2011 Premier League Season is the 15th consecutive season that the Sheffield Tigers has competed at the 2nd tier of British Speedway. Following from a successful 2010 Campaign, the Tigers hope to end their 8-year wait for the Premier League Title.

Close Season
After ending the 2010 campaign with the first team trophy (Premier League Pairs) since 2002, the Tigers will be hoping go one step further in 2011. For the 5th season running, The Tigers will be sponsored by local business Sheffield Window Centre for the following season. Following the AGM meeting over the weekend of the 20/21 November, the Tigers declared their intention to race over the 2011 however there will be a new look to Premier League Speedway. Local rivals Stoke Potters withdrew from the Premier League to race in the National League, while the Birmingham Brummies elected to move up to the Elite League. This allowed 2 new teams to enter, with the Leicester Lions successfully being granted entry after failing in 2010, and the Ipswich Witches deciding to swap league memberships with the Brummies to fill the allocated spots.
However, with the Elite League seemingly in turmoil with the withdrawals of the Coventry Bees and the Peterborough Panthers, the Elite League required 1 further team to be able to track a full season. The Kings Lynn Stars elected to join the speedway elite and therefore withdrew from the Premier League. This further allowed another entry to the Premier League, with the place being allocated to the Plymouth Devils.
This was later confirmed that no other teams will be granted entry to the Premier League, therefore completing the line-up for 2011.

Team Building for 2011
Following the 2009 AGM, it was decided that a 42.50 points limit would be set for 3 years, with the 2011 season being the last. This was later confirmed at the current AGM. However, before the AGM took place the Tigers had already announced 2 riders who would be riding in the yellow and blue of the Tigers for 2011. On 22 October, Josh Auty was the first confirmed starter for his 3rd consecutive season for Sheffield. Then on 3 November, Hugh Skidmore was the second confirmed starter for his 2nd full season with the Owlerton outfit. Following Kings Lynn's election to the Elite League, Simon Lambert (Kings Lynn's Asset) became available and was snapped up by the tigers on 1 December as their 3rd signing for the 2011 season. The same day, it was announced that club asset Emiliano Sanchez was recalled to the 2011 team. Sanchez was loaned out to Redcar last year. Sanchez has not ridden for Sheffield since 2006. After weeks of talks with ex-captain Ricky Ashworth, it was announced on 6 December 2010 that Ricky would once again ride for Sheffield for his 10th successive year. Due to his ten years with the Tigers, Ricky will now be due a Testimonial Meeting in 2011. The sixth signing was officially announced on 15 December to be current Sheffield Tigers Asset Shane Parker. Although Shane has never ridden for the Tigers before, he became a Sheffield Asset when the Hull Vikings closed and Sheffield purchased all the current Hull Assets. After announcing Shane as the new number 1 for 2011, Shane announced that this would be his last season riding British Speedway before returning home to Australia. The Tigers septet was completed on 22 December with the signing of local rider Ashley Birks from Scunthorpe. It isn't however confirmed whether it was a full transfer or a loan.

2011 Team Averages

2011 Fixtures
Official Fixture List is yet to be produced. Therefore, no fixture list is yet available.
The opening fixture for the season was an inter-league challenge against local rivals Belle Vue Aces. The meeting is the second meeting of the teams in as many years, as the Aces were the opening challenge meeting of the 2010 season.
It was also confirmed at the BSPA AGM that the Tigers would face the Edinburgh Monarchs in the 1st round of the 2011 Premier League KOC. No dates have yet been confirmed.

Premier League First Phase

Home Meetings

Away Meetings

Premier League Second Phase
The format and cut-off point for the split is made as each team reaches 10 home and 10 away matches. Group 1 will be teams placed 1st, 4th, 5th, 8th, 9th, 12th and 14th - Group 2 is 2nd, 3rd, 6th, 7th, 10th, 11th and 13th.
Those additional 12 matches are then added onto the points gained from the 26 meetings in Round 1.

Premier League KOC
The Tigers were drawn against the Monarchs for the 1st round of the competition.

Round 1

Sheffield Tigers qualified for Round 2 by defeating the Edinburgh Monarchs 94-86 on aggregate.

Round 2

Challenge Meetings
The first challenge of the season was an Inter-League meetings against local rivals Belle Vue Aces.

League table

Home: 3W = Home win by 7 points or more; 2W = Home win by between 1 and 6 points
Away: 4W = Away win by 7 points or more; 3W = Away win by between 1 and 6 points; 1L = Away loss by 6 points or less
M = Meetings; D = Draws; L = Losses; F = Race points for; A = Race points against; +/- = Race points difference; Pts = Total Points

Last updated: 31 May 2011

Source: BSPA

References

Speedway Premier League